Östergötlands Arbetartidning was a communist weekly newspaper published in Norrköping, Sweden from October 1945 to April 1957. It had a weekly edition of around 10,888 in 1945.

References

1945 establishments in Sweden
1957 disestablishments in Sweden
Communist newspapers published in Sweden
Defunct newspapers published in Sweden
Defunct weekly newspapers
Left Party (Sweden)
Mass media in Norrköping
Newspapers established in 1945
Publications disestablished in 1957
Swedish-language newspapers